Hadena adriana is a species of moth of the family Noctuidae. It is found in Tunisia, southern France, Italy, the Balkans, Turkey, Israel and Lebanon.
 
Adults are on wing in May. There is one generation per year.

The larvae probably feed on capsules of Caryophyllaceae species.

External links
 Hadeninae of Israel

Hadena
Moths of Europe
Moths of Africa
Moths of Asia
Moths described in 1921